Silence the Witness is a 1974 Italian poliziottesco film written and directed by Giuseppe Rosati.

Cast 

 Bekim Fehmiu: Dr. Giorgio Sironi
 Rosanna Schiaffino: Luisa Sironi 
 Aldo Giuffrè: Inspector Santi 
 Guido Leontini: Mancuso
 Romolo Valli: The Minister 
 Elio Zamuto: Judge Belli 
 Luigi Pistilli: Inspector De Luca 
 Claudio Nicastro: Commander
 Guido Alberti: Chief of Police
 Franco Ressel:  Aldo Marchetti 
 Liana Trouche: Santi's wife
 Daniele Vargas: Senator Torrisi  
 Luciano Rossi: Antonio
 Enzo Maggio: Clerk

References

External links

1970s Italian-language films
Poliziotteschi films
1970s crime action films
Italian crime action films
Films directed by Giuseppe Rosati
Films scored by Francesco De Masi
1970s Italian films